This is a list of Registered Historic Places in Tiverton, Rhode Island, which has been transferred from and is an integral part of National Register of Historic Places listings in Newport County, Rhode Island.

|}

See also

National Register of Historic Places listings in Newport County, Rhode Island
List of National Historic Landmarks in Rhode Island

References

N
.N
.Tiverton
Tiverton
Tiverton, Rhode Island